Don D'Ambra (born May 5, 1972 in Philadelphia) is a retired American soccer forward who currently coaches the Saint Joseph's University men's soccer team.

Player

Youth
D'Ambra graduated from Northeast Catholic High School.  He then attended Saint Joseph's University, playing soccer there from 1990 to 1994. He scored 41 goals and 102 points during his career, setting school records in both categories.  He additionally holds school records for goals in a season with 15, and points in a season with 38. He is the only player from Saint Joseph's ever to be named Atlantic 10 player of the year.

Professional
He began his professional career with the Milwaukee Wave of the National Professional Soccer League in 1994.  He was a 1994–1995 All Rookie forward. In 1995, D'Ambra spent the outdoor season with the Chicago Stingers of the USISL.  In 1995, he left the Wave for the Philadelphia KiXX' inaugural season.  From 1996 to 2002, he was solely a player for the Kixx, but from 2002 to 2010, he assumed a head coaching role as well.  He currently holds all-time club records for games played (436), points (1020), goals (380), and game winning goals (42). He has reached the 100 point plateau three different seasons, including a career high in 1997–1998.  In 1997 and 1998, D'Ambra played for the Hershey Wildcats in the USISL A-League.  He also returned during the 2009–2010 indoor season to play nine games for the KiXX.

Futsal
In 2003, D'Ambra joined the United States national futsal team and continued to play for it through the 2008 Pan American Games.

Coach
On October 24, 2002, he was appointed interim head coach of the Philadelphia KiXX from the Major Indoor Soccer League. On December 3, he was officially named the club's third head coach, succeeding Omid Namazi. From 2002 to 2010, he served as a player-coach for the squad, amassing a club record 111 wins. He led the 2007 squad to an MISL championship. On April 15, 2010, he was named head men's soccer coach at Saint Joseph's University.

References

External links
 https://web.archive.org/web/20100423193334/http://www.sjuhawks.com/sports/m-soccer/mtt/dambra_don00.html
 https://web.archive.org/web/20090906130311/http://kixxonline.com/team/frontoffice/?staff_id=11
 Saint Joseph's Hawks bio

1972 births
American men's futsal players
American soccer coaches
American soccer players
Chicago Sockers players
Futsal players at the 2007 Pan American Games
Hershey Wildcats players
Milwaukee Wave players
National Professional Soccer League (1984–2001) coaches
National Professional Soccer League (1984–2001) players
Pan American Games competitors for the United States
Philadelphia KiXX players
Saint Joseph's Hawks men's soccer coaches
Saint Joseph's Hawks men's soccer players
Soccer players from Philadelphia
Sportspeople from Philadelphia
Living people
USISL players
Association football forwards